Vuniuci Tikomaimereke (born 7 June 1990) is a Fijian footballer who mainly plays as a left-back for Fijian club Rewa and the Fiji national team.

Club career
Tikomaimereke started his career with Nadi. In 2017 he moved to Rewa

National team
In 2017 Tikomaimereke was called up by coach Christophe Gamel for the Fiji national football team. He made his debut on May 25, 2017, in a 1–1 draw against the Solomon Islands. He played from the start of the game and was subbed after 55 minutes of play for Ilaitia Tuilau.

References

Fijian footballers
Association football defenders
Nadi F.C. players
Rewa F.C. players
Fiji international footballers
Living people
1990 births